Glutamatergic means "related to glutamate". A glutamatergic agent (or drug) is a chemical that directly modulates the excitatory amino acid (glutamate/aspartate) system in the body or brain. Examples include excitatory amino acid receptor agonists, excitatory amino acid receptor antagonists, and excitatory amino acid reuptake inhibitors.

See also
 Adenosinergic
 Adrenergic
 Cannabinoidergic
 Cholinergic
 Dopaminergic
 GABAergic
 GHBergic
 Glycinergic
 Histaminergic
 Melatonergic
 Monoaminergic
 Opioidergic
 Serotonergic
 Sigmaergic

References

Neurochemistry
Neurotransmitters